The 1957 Green Bay Packers season was their 39th season overall and their 37th season in the National Football League. After a week one win against the Chicago Bears, The team finished with a 3–9 record under fourth-year head coach Lisle Blackbourn and finished last in the Western Conference. It was Blackbourn's final season at Green Bay, who was replaced by Ray McLean in January 1958 for just one year, succeeded by Vince Lombardi in 1959.

The 1957 season also marked the Packers' move from City Stadium to new City Stadium, which was opened with a win over the Chicago Bears in week one on September 29. It was renamed Lambeau Field in August 1965 in memory of Packers founder, player, and long-time head coach, Curly Lambeau, who had died two months earlier.

Offseason

NFL draft 

 Green indicates a future Pro Football Hall of Fame inductee
 Yellow indicates a future Pro Bowl selection

Regular season

Schedule

Season summary

Week 1 vs Bears 

First game at New City Stadium

Standings

Roster

Awards, records, and honors

References 

 Sportsencyclopedia.com

Green Bay Packers seasons
Green Bay Packers